The 2015 Illinois State Redbirds football team represented Illinois State University as a member of the Missouri Valley Football Conference (MVFC) during the 2015 NCAA Division I FCS football season. Led by seventh-year head coach Brock Spack, the Redbirds compiled an overall record of 10–3 with a mark of 7–1 in conference play, sharing the MVFC title with North Dakota State for the second consecutive season. Illinois State received an at-large bid to the NCAA Division I Football Championship playoffs. After a first-round bye, the Redbirds defeated Western Illinois in the second round, before losing to Richmond in the quarterfinals. The team played home games at Hancock Stadium in Normal, Illinois.

Schedule

Game summaries

@ Iowa

Morgan State

@ Eastern Illinois

Northern Iowa

@ Youngstown State

@ Missouri State

Western Illinois

Indiana State

@ South Dakota State

@ Southern Illinois

South Dakota

Western Illinois—NCAA Division I Second Round

Richmond—NCAA Division I Quarterfinal

Ranking movements

References

Illinois State
Illinois State Redbirds football seasons
Missouri Valley Football Conference champion seasons
Illinois State
Illinois State Redbirds football